Pedro Julián Bautista Santos Carpio (born 9 January 1955) is a Peruvian accountant and politician. He is a former Congressman representing Arequipa for the period 2006–2011, and belongs to the Peruvian Nationalist Party.

References

Living people
1955 births
Union for Peru politicians
Members of the Congress of the Republic of Peru

Peruvian Nationalist Party politicians
People from Arequipa Region
Place of birth missing (living people)